Electric Railway Journal was an American magazine primarily about electric urban rail transit in North America, published by McGraw Hill from June 1908 until December 1931. It was founded when publications Street Railway Journal (first published November 1884) and Electric Railway Review (first published January 1891) merged. Initially published weekly, it became monthly in April 1929 until ceasing in December 1931.

References

External links

Defunct magazines published in the United States
Magazines established in 1908
Magazines disestablished in 1941
Magazines published in New York City
Monthly magazines published in the United States
Transport magazines published in the United States
Weekly magazines published in the United States
1908 establishments in New York City
1931 disestablishments in New York (state)